Kelemen László (1762-1814), was a Hungarian stage dramatist and theater director. He played a major pioneer role in Hungarian theater history as the founder of the first professional Hungarian language theater company in Hungary, for which he also produced plays.

References 

 Endrődy János: A magyar játékszinek története. (Pest, 1792-.) (A M. Játékszin I-III.)

1762 births
1814 deaths
18th-century Hungarian people
18th-century theatre managers